Sam, Bangs & Moonshine is a 1966 children's picture book written and illustrated by Evaline Ness. Published by Holt, Rinehart and Winston, it won the 1967 Caldecott Medal for its illustrations.

Plot

Samantha (usually called Sam) is a motherless child of a fisherman. To keep herself busy, she pretends that her mother is a mermaid and that Bangs, her cat, can talk to her. Sam also claims to have a pet kangaroo. She prefers her fantasies to reality but her father calls her tales "moonshine" and warns Sam that moonshine will one day lead her into great trouble.

Little neighbor Thomas eagerly believes every word Sam says. One day Sam tells the pleading boy of a not-too-distant cove where he can find her mermaid mother. Bangs follows Thomas on a journey to the cove; but, unfortunately, they are caught up in a seastorm and lost. At home, Sam becomes very frightened when Thomas and the cat don't return, and she tearfully asks her father for help. Luckily, Thomas is found alive (Bangs is later found safe as well), but the boy is now ill. Sam finally understands the importance of telling people about things that are real, as opposed to things that are moonshine.

Sam apologizes to the sick little boy (who, the readers can safely presume, will make a complete recovery), and cheers Thomas up by showing him something that is both real and fantastical.

References

Caldecott Medal–winning works
Books about cats
American picture books
Holt, Rinehart and Winston books
1966 children's books
Fictional cats